Beta Leonis Minoris, Latinized from β Leonis Minoris, is a binary star in the constellation of Leo Minor. It has an overall apparent visual magnitude of approximately 4.2. Although it is the only star in Leo Minor with a Bayer designation, it is only the second brightest star in the constellation (the brightest is 46 Leonis Minoris).

Binary system
β Leonis Minoris is a binary that can be resolved for a portion of each orbit. When the two components are too close to resolve, it appears as a single G9 giant star with some indications of a second set of spectral lines. The orbit derived as a double-lined spectroscopic binary is poor, and a better orbit has been calculated using only the spectral lines of the primary, plus input from the known visual observations. The orbital period is nearly 39 years and the eccentricity is high at 0.683.

The primary star is a late G-class red clump giant, a star that is fusing helium in its core and lies at the cool end of the horizontal branch.  The properties of the secondary star can only be estimated from its relative brightness and its spectral class.  It is an F8 subgiant, hotter than the sun and starting to evolve away from the main sequence.

References

G-type giants
G-type subgiants
F-type subgiants
Horizontal-branch stars
Binary stars

Leo Minor
Leonis_Minoris, Beta
Durchmusterung objects
Leonis Minoris, 31
090537
051233
4100